Post-War is the fifth studio album by M. Ward. It was released on August 22, 2006, by Merge Records. It features the single "To Go Home", a cover of a song written by Daniel Johnston. Guest appearances were made by Jim James of My Morning Jacket (who produced the track "Magic Trick"), Rachel Blumberg, drummer for the indie rock band The Decemberists, Neko Case, and Mike Mogis. Ward has said that the song "Today's Undertaking" was heavily inspired by Roy Orbison's 1963 single "In Dreams".

Track listing
All songs by Matt Ward except where noted.
 "Poison Cup" – 2:40
 "To Go Home" – 3:51 (Daniel Johnston)
 "Right in the Head" – 4:12
 "Post-War" – 4:55
 "Requiem" – 2:48
 "Chinese Translation" – 3:58
 "Eyes on the Prize" – 2:37
 "Magic Trick" – 1:43
 "Neptune's Net" – 2:06
 "Rollercoaster" – 2:48
 "Today's Undertaking" – 2:26
 "Afterword/Rag" – 3:32
 "Chinese Translation" (enhanced video)

Personnel
 M. Ward – guitars, voice, keys, chimes on 4
 Mike Coykendall – bass, percussion on 4, 10, voice on 6, 7, 10, drums on 1, 8, harp on 8
 Jordan Hudson– drums on 2, 3, 4, 5, 6, 9, percussion on 7
 Rachel Blumberg – drums on 2, 5, 6, 8, 9, 11, 12, voice on 12
 Mike Mogis – timpani on 1, 11, mandolin on 3, chimes on 9, 11, cymbal on 9, 11, 12, triangle on 9, Omnichord on 11, Chamberlin on 12
 Amanda Lawrence – violin, viola on 1, 11
 Jim James – voice on 6, 8, guitar on 8
 Skip Von Kuske – cello, bass on 1
 Neko Case – voice on 2

Charts

References

2006 albums
M. Ward albums
4AD albums
Merge Records albums